Sirolo is a comune (municipality) in the Province of Ancona in the Italian region of Marche.

The town is situated near Monte Conero and in medieval times it was a castle which belonged to the Conti Cortesi family. It is a tourist destination, especially in summer times and it has continuously been awarded one of the eleven blue flags in the region of Marche since 1994. It features a restored medieval town centre, which culminates with a particular little square with view on the sea and on the Monte Conero. As tourist destination, Sirolo has many restaurants and bars. From the main square, there is a 10-minute walk to several beaches.

Beaches 

Spiaggia Urbani is located just above the centre and offers amenities such as sunbeds, umbrellas and kayaks rentals, bars and restaurant.

Spiaggia San Michele is located just next to Urbani and, while still offering the same amenities, it has a wilder look.

Spiaggia delle Due Sorelle is a beach of white round pebbles which can be seen through the crystal clear water. The name of this beach, which means "two sisters" is due to the twin sea stack raising from the water,which look like two nouns praying.

Demographic evolution